Eua is a genus of air-breathing land snails, terrestrial pulmonate gastropod mollusks in the family Partulidae.

Species
Species within the genus Eua include:
 Eua expansa
 Eua globosa
 Eua montana
 Eua zebrina

A cladogram showing phylogenic relations of Eua species:

References

External links 

Partulidae evolution, diversity and conservation Partula Pages

Partulidae
Taxonomy articles created by Polbot